Klithi or Kleidi Cave (Spelaio Kleidi) is located to the north of the village of Kleidonia in the Ioannina regional unit and around  west of the Megalakkos Cave, northwestern Greece. It is situated atop the northern bank of the Voidomatis river valley.

Archaeology

Archaeological excavations that were undertaken by a British team between 1983 and 1986 revealed the cave that contained artifacts, stone tools, faunal remains and other fossils, that were dated back to the Paleolithic and the Epigravettian culture between 20,000 and 12,000 years ago. Analogous discoveries were made by the same research team in the neighboring Megalakkos cave.

References

Caves of Greece
Landforms of Ioannina (regional unit)
Prehistoric Greece
Landforms of Epirus (region)